The Women's Shot Put athletics events for the 2016 Summer Paralympics took place at the Rio Olympic Stadium from September 8 to September 17, 2016. A total of 14 events are contested incorporating 17 different classifications.

Three competitors won a medal for their country for the first time at the Summer Paralympics. Fatema Nedham, representing Bahrain, Sara Al Senaani, representing United Arab Emirates, and Sara Hamdi Masoud, representing Qatar, became the first female athletes to win a medal for their country in this event.

Schedule

Medal summary

Results

F12 (incorporating F11)
Competed 14 September 2016 at 10:15.

F20
Competed 10 September 2016 at 15:38.

F32
Competed 17 September 2016 at 17:33.

F33
Competed 16 September 2016 at 17:33.

F34
Competed 14 September 2016 at 17:30.

F35
Competed 15 September 2016 at 17:58.

F36
Competed 17 September 2016 at 10:52.

F37
Competed 13 September 2016 at 18:10.

F40
Competed 11 September 2016 at 23:16.

F41
Competed 9 September 2016 at 15:53.

F42

F53
Competed 12 September 2016 at 15:03.

F54
Competed 10 September 2016 at 15:05.

F57 (incorporating F56)
Competed 8 September 2016 at 22:33.

References

Athletics at the 2016 Summer Paralympics